Willoughby State Forest covers  in Newark, Sutton and Westmore in Caledonia and Orleans counties in Vermont. The forest is managed by the Vermont Department of Forests, Parks, and Recreation. Activities include hiking, primitive camping, cross country skiing, snowshoeing, hunting and fishing.

Features

Willoughby State Forest is easily accessible from State Routes 5 and 5A and is bisected by Lake Willoughby, with Mount Hor (2648 feet) to the west and Mount Pisgah (2751 feet) to the east. It is located on the divide between the Saint Lawrence and Connecticut River watersheds.
The highest peak in the forest is Bald Mountain at 3315 feet in elevation. 

Willoughby State Forest contains two natural areas: Willoughby Cliffs Natural Area in Westmore (950 acres) and Marl Pond and Swamp Natural Area in Sutton (30 acres).

References

External links
Official website
Travel the Kingdom: E- Willoughby State Forest Hikes

Vermont state forests
Protected areas of Caledonia County, Vermont
Protected areas of Orleans County, Vermont
Newark, Vermont
Sutton, Vermont
Westmore, Vermont